Austrochloritis pusilla is a species of air-breathing land snail, a terrestrial pulmonate gastropod mollusk in the family Camaenidae. This species is endemic to Australia.

References

Gastropods of Australia
pusilla
Gastropods described in 1912
Taxonomy articles created by Polbot
Taxobox binomials not recognized by IUCN